Etho Oru Swapnam is a 1978 Indian Malayalam-language romantic drama film  directed and produced by Sreekumaran Thampi. The film stars Sheela, Sukumaran, Sreelatha Namboothiri, Jagathy Sreekumar and Jayan in the lead roles. The film has musical score by Salil Chowdhary.

Plot
Kausalya is a divorcee and wants to prevent the marriage of her daughter Shobha. She ties up with another divorcee Susheela. However, her attempts fail when her former husbands Janardhanan Nair and Divakaran Nair tie up and a godman V.V.Swami gets involved in the matter as well. It turns out he is also divorced.

Cast

 Jagathy Sreekumar as Janardhanan Nair
 Sreelatha Namboothiri as Susheela
 Sukumaran as Divakaran Nair
 Sheela as Kausalya
 Jayan as V. V. Swami/Vasudevab
 Kanakadurga as Sathyavathi
 Mallika Sukumaran as Vijayamma
 Nanditha Bose as Thara
 Ravikumar as Krishnachandran
 Vaikkam Mani as Sathyavathi's father
 Kailasnath as Abhayan
 Priyamvada as Shobha
 Somasekharan Nair as Film Producer

Soundtrack
The music was composed by Salil Chowdhary and the lyrics were written by Sreekumaran Thampi.

Box office
The film became a commercial success.

References

External links
 

1978 films
1970s Malayalam-language films
Films scored by Salil Chowdhury
Films directed by Sreekumaran Thampi